The University of Agriculture (UAD), Dera Ismail Khan is a newly established University, charted by the Khyber Pakhtunkhwa Provincial Assembly on March 2018 and recognized by Higher Education Commission (HEC) Pakistan on May 05, 2021. It was originally a faculty of Agriculture in Gomal University Dera Ismail Khan.The University of Agriculture DI Khan started its academic activities for the Fall-2021. The University of Agriculture is located at the Sadiq Awan Memorial Complex, Near Baahoo Flour Mill, Bhakkar Road, Dera Ismail Khan.
Currently, UAD is offering different undergraduate and diploma programs. Keeping in view the purpose of its research orientation, University has started work to develop various research organizations i.e. Date Palm Research Institute Dhakki DIKhan, Temperate Research Institute Wana, Sugarcane Research Institute DIKhan.

Overview and history 
University of Agriculture Dera Ismail Khan is established by Government of Khyber Pakhtunwa in March 2018. It was originally a faculty of Agriculture in Gomal University Dera Ismail Khan.First Senate Meeting of University of Agriculture took place at Governor House Peshawar on June 17, 2021 and the Budget for 2021-22 was approved. The Government of Khyber Pakhtunkhwa has allocated Rs.1000 million for the development works of the University. It was originally a faculty of Agriculture in Gomal University Dera Ismail Khan. The Government of Khyber Pakhtunkhwa has now upgraded the department into full-fledged university in March 2018.

Departments 
The University of Agriculture Dera Ismail Khan has currently the following departments.
 Faculty of Veterinary and Animal Sciences (FVAS)
 Department of Agronomy
 Department of Agriculture Chemistry
 Department of Entomology
 Department of Food Science Technology
 Department of Horticulture
 Department of Plant Breeding and Genetics 
 Department of Soil & Environmental Sciences
 Department of Basic Sciences
 Department of Forestry
 Department of Animal & Veterinary Sciences
 Department of Botany and Zoology 
 Department of Biotechnology & Biochemistry
 Department of Human Nutrition and Dietetics 
 Department of English and foreign languages 
 Department of Agriculture Economics and Rural Sociology

See also 
 Gomal University Dera Ismail Khan
 University of Agriculture, Peshawar

References 

Public universities and colleges in Khyber Pakhtunkhwa
Educational institutions established in 2017
2017 establishments in Pakistan
Dera Ismail Khan District
Agricultural universities and colleges in Pakistan